The 2022 FIA Motorsport Games Karting Slalom Cup was the second FIA Motorsport Games Karting Slalom Cup, it was held at Circuit Paul Ricard, France on 26 October to 30 October 2022. The race was contested with identical electric-powered karts. The event was the part of the 2022 FIA Motorsport Games.

Drivers raced around the cones, receiving penalty seconds for every cone knocked off.

The competition format was two classification sessions and then knockout stages going from Round of 16, Quarterfinals, Semi-finals and Finals

Entry List
All entered drivers will compete with identical electric-powered Birel ART N35-YR karts .

Each team was composed by two drivers, one male and one female, between 14-15 years old.

Results

Classification S1 & S2
      Proceeds to the Round of 16
      Eliminated 

Notes
 Despite being shown in the entry list and in the official starting order, neither of the team Nigeria's drivers recorded times.

Knock-out stages and final

Overall Ranking
      Won the Final
      Lost the Final
      Won the Small Final
      Lost the Small Final
      Eliminated in the Quarterfinals
      Eliminated in the Round of 16
      Eliminated in the Qualifiers

References

External links

Karting Slalom|Karting